Pattabhi Sundar Raman (born 7 November 1960) is an Indian Senior Advocate and former Advocate-General of Tamil Nadu. He is the younger son of former Advocate-General and Dravida Munnetra Kazhagam politician V. P. Raman.

Early life and education 

Pattabhi Sundar Raman was born on 7 November 1960. His father is Indian lawyer V. P. Raman who served as the Advocate-General of Tamil Nadu from 1977 to 1979. His elder brother is the popular stage and television personality Mohan V. Ram.

Sundar Raman did his schooling in Vidya Mandir, Chennai and graduated in commerce from Loyola College, Chennai. Raman obtained his law degree from the Madras Law College.

Career 

Raman started practising as a lawyer in 1985 and founded the law firm Raman and Associates on the death of his father in 1991.

Raman practised in the Madras High Court and the Supreme Court of India and was, in September 2004, designated a senior advocate of the Madras High Court. On 11 June 2006, Raman was appointed Additional Advocate-General in place of R. Mutthukumaraswamy who had resigned. Raman became the Advocate-General on 29 July 2009, when the serving Advocate-General of Tamil Nadu G. Masilamani tendered his resignation.

Controversies 

When senior politician Abhishek Manu Singhvi of the Indian National Congress withdrew from appearing on behalf of Megha Distributors, a lottery promotion agency challenging a lottery ban imposed by the Government of Kerala due to criticism from the Kerala state unit of the party, Raman took over the case. This action was severely criticized by the state cabinet and Chief Minister of Kerala V. S. Achuthanandan as well as senior Congress politician and Oommen Chandy. Eventually, at the advice of M. Karunanidhi, the Chief Minister of Tamil Nadu, Raman offered to withdraw from the case.

Notes 

1960 births
Living people
20th-century Indian lawyers
Advocates General for Tamil Nadu